Kevin Buys (born 26 April 1986) is a South African rugby union player for Beaune in the Fédérale 1 in France.

Career
In 2007, he made his debut in the Vodacom Cup competition. He then moved to French club CA Brive in November 2007. He played in the Espoirs (their reserve team), but graduated to the first team. He made 15 appearances for the team in the 2007–08 Top 14 season. He just made a further five appearances for the team the following season, three of those in the 2008–09 European Challenge Cup.

He then returned to South Africa and joined the  team in 2009. He was also named in the  squad for the 2013 Super Rugby season.

In 2013, he rejoined French Top 14 side CA Brive for a second time.

References

South African rugby union players
Eastern Province Elephants players
Southern Kings players
Living people
1986 births
Golden Lions players
Lions (United Rugby Championship) players
Blue Bulls players
Rugby union players from Benoni
University of Pretoria alumni
Rugby union props